Uhlířská Lhota is a municipality and village in Kolín District in the Central Bohemian Region of the Czech Republic. It has about 400 inhabitants.

Administrative parts
The village of Rasochy is an administrative part of Uhlířská Lhota.

References

Villages in Kolín District